The Sumiller de Corps  was the Officer of the Royal Household and Heritage of the Crown of Spain in charge of the more intimate and inner  rooms of the King of Spain. He was responsible of the most immediate service to the Monarch. This Office was suppressed after the proclamation of the Second Spanish Republic in 1931 and never re-created after the restoration of the Monarchy in 1975.

Historical precedents 

This Office was created when, during the Habsburg dynasty, the Spanish Royal Court was shaped after that one that existed in the Court of Burgundy where this Office “Sumiller” from the French “Sommelier”, literally “Wine steward” existed from the old past. Charles V, Holy Roman Emperor, but also King of Spain, imported the etiquette styled in the Court of his paternal grandmother Mary of Burgundy.

Regime during the 16th, the 17th and the 18th centuries 

Diverse dispositions regulated the duties of the “Sumiller de Corps” distinguishing from those of the “Mayordomo mayor” to the King. Although this latter Office was hierarchically higher, the Office of “Sumiller de Corps” was mostly coveted by the high ranks of the nobility, the Grandees of Spain, as it gave full access to the intimacy of the King.  And, certainly, thanks to this intimacy with the King, he could influence the concession and distribution of all kinds of graces and mercies. In fact, the Validos of the Habsburg Kings were always their “Sumilleres de Corps” as it happened with the Duke of Lerma and the Duke of Uceda with King Philip III or the Count-Duke of Olivares with  King Philip IV.

During the 17th and 18th centuries, the ceremonial laws regulating the Royal service confirmed the principal prerogatives that the traditional Burgundian etiquette granted to the “Sumiller de Corps”, in the measure in which they supposed a great intimacy and a physical daily contact with the Monarch. Those of the Royal Chamber of 1659 established that the organization of the closest service to the King corresponded to the “Sumiller de Corps” and, in this way, he might sleep in a bed in the same room of the Sovereign. If this was not possible, or the Monarch wanted to relieve him of this obligation, he had to sleep at least in the Royal Palace. He had, anyway,  to deliver the King personally the towel, the shirt, the Golden Fleece, the clothes and the cap and, during meals and dinners, serve him the glass of wine.

Only a peer who had the rank of Grandee of Spain could be appointed for this Office.

Regime during the 19th and 20th centuries 

With King Ferdinand VII this Office was losing the more and more importance. In fact, it was suppressed by his grandson Alfonso XII when monarchy was restored in 1875. It was not until 1906 that it was created again but with a pure symbolistic character and always attached to the Office of “Mayordomo mayor” as this was the highest office of the Royal Household. The sole exception to this rule was between 1925 and 1927 when the second one was exercised by the duke of Miranda and the first one by the Marquess of Viana, Caballerizo mayor, who in addition, had the privy seal of the King.

In spite of the latter circumstance, under the “Sumiller de Corps”, at least organically, and in agreement with his former function which t has been mentioned before, they were the royal servants who accompanied at all time the Monarch, the “Gentilhombres Grandes de España con ejercicio y servidumbre” (Gentlemen of the bedchamber Grandees of Spain) and those called “Gentilhombres de camara con ejercicio” (Gentlemen of the bedchamber).

Equally until their suppression in 1918, there existed under his command the ranks of “Gentilhombres de Casa y Boca” (literally the Gentlemen of House and Mouth), and “Gentilhombres de Entrada” (literally Gentlemen of Entry).

All this classes of royal servants were chosen between gentlemen, mostly from the nobility, and in the latter times of the reign of Alfonso XIII from people with prestigious professional background as famous officers of the Army, well-known physicians or businessmen, etc. Only the first one of these classes, the Gentlemen Grandees of Spain, had real functions close to the King and they had a weekly shift to stay with the Monarch in all sorts of activities.

List of "Sumilleres de Corps"  to the King of Spain between 1515 and 1931

“Sumilleres de Corps” to Charles V, Holy Roman Emperor, 1516-1556 

 1515-1521: Paule de Amersdorf
 1528-1528: Charles de Poupet, Lord of La Chaulx
 1531-1556: Joaquín de Rye, Lord of Balanchon

“Sumilleres de Corps” to King Philip II, 1556-1598 

 1556-1557: Antonio de Rojas y de Velasco
 1557-1573: Ruy Gómez de Silva, Duke of Pastrana, Grandee of Spain
 1585-1592:  Juan de Acuña,  Count of Buendía, Grandee of Spain
 1592-1598: Cristóbal de Moura, Count of Castel Rodrigo, Grandee of Spain

“Sumilleres de Corps” to King Philip III, 1598-1621 

 1598-1599: Cristóbal de Moura, Marquess of Castel Rodrigo, Grandee of Spain
 1599-1618:Francisco de Sandoval y Rojas, Duke of Lerma, Grandee of Spain
 1618-1621: Cristóbal Gómez de Sandoval y de la Cerda, Duke of Uceda, Grandee of Spain

“Sumilleres de Corps” to King  Philip IV, 1621-1665 

 1621-1622: Baltasar de Zúñiga
 1622-1626: Gaspar de Guzmán, Count and Duke of Olivares, Grandee of Spain
 1626-1636: Ramiro Núñez de Guzmán, Duke of Medina de las Torres, Grandee of Spain
 1636-1643: Gaspar de Guzmán, Count and Duke of Olivares, Grandee of Spain
 1643-1665: Ramiro Núñez de Guzmán, Duke of Medina de las Torres, Grandee of Spain

“Sumilleres de Corps” to  King Charles II, 1665-1701 

 1665-1668: Ramiro Núñez de Guzmán, Duke of Medina de las Torres, Grandee of Spain
 1674-1687: Juan Francisco de la Cerda, Duke of Medinaceli, Grandee of Spain
 1687-1693: Gregorio María de Silva y Mendoza, 9th Duke of the Infantado, Grandee of Spain
 1693-1701: Francisco Pimentel Vigil y Quiñones, Duke of Benavente, Grandee of Spain

“Sumilleres de Corps” to  King Philip V, 1701-1724 

 1701-1709: Francisco Pimentel Vigil y Quiñones, Duke of Benavente, Grandee of Spain
 1711: Antonio Álvarez de Toledo y Guzmán, Duke of Alba, Grandee of Spain
 1711-1722:  Martín Domingo de Guzmán,  Marquess of Quintana del Marco, Grandee of Spain

“Sumiller de Corps” to  King Louis I, 1724 

 1724:  Antonio Osorio y Moscoso, Duke of Sanlúcar la Mayor, Grandee of Spain

“Sumilleres de Corps” to  King Philip V, 1724-1746 

 1724-1725:  Antonio Osorio y Moscoso, Duke of Sanlúcar la Mayor, Grandee of Spain
 1725-1727:  Baltasar de Zuñiga, Duke of Arión, Grandee of Spain
 1728-1741: Agustín Fernández de Velasco y Bracamonte, Duke of Frías, Grandee of Spain
 1741-1746: Juan Pizarro de Aragón, Marquess of  San Juan de Piedras Albas, Grandee of Spain

“Sumilleres de Corps” to  King Ferdinand VI, 1746-1759 

 1746-1748: Juan Pizarro de Aragón, Marquess of  San Juan de Piedras Albas, Grandee of Spain
 1748-1757: Sebastián Guzmán de Spínola, Marquess of Montealegre, Grandee of Spain
 1757-1758: José María Guzmán Vélez y Ladrón de Guevara, Count of Oñate, Grandee of Spain
 1758-1759:  Joaquín López de Zúñiga y Castro, Duke of Béjar, Grandee of Spain

“Sumilleres de Corps” to  King Charles III, 1759-1788 

 1759-1783: José Fernández de Miranda Ponce de León, Duke of Losada, Grandee of Spain
 1783-1788:  Judas Tadeo Fernández de Miranda Ponce de León y Villacís, Marquess of Valdecarzana,

“Sumilleres de Corps” to  King Charles IV, 1788-1808 

 1788-1792:  Judas Tadeo Fernández de Miranda Ponce de León y Villacís, Marquess of Valdecarzana,
 1792-1802:  Diego Pacheco y Téllez-Girón, Duke of Frías, Grandee of Spain
 1802-1808: Vicente María Palafox Rebolledo Mexia Silva,  Marquess of Ariza, Grandee of Spain

“Sumilleres de Corps” to  King Ferdinand VII, 1808 and 1814-1833 

 1808-1809: Ignacio de Arteaga e Idiáquez, Marquess of Valmediano, Grandee of Spain ||
 1809-1812: Juan de la Cruz Belbis de Moncada y Pizarro, Marquess of Bélgida, Grandee of Spain || (1)
 1812-1814: Ignacio de Arteaga e Idiáquez, Marquess of Valmediano, Grandee of Spain || (1)
 1814-1820: Vicente María Palafox Rebolledo Mexia Silva,  Marquess of Ariza, Grandee of Spain
 1820-1822: Francisco de Paula Fernández de Córdoba Lasso de la Vega, Count of la Puebla del Maestre, Grandee of Spain
 1822-1823: José Gabriel de Silva-Bazán y Waldstein, Marquess of Santa Cruz de Mudela, Grandee of Spain
 1823-1824: Francisco de Paula Fernández de Córdoba Lasso de la Vega, Count of la Puebla del Maestre, Grandee of Spain
 1824-1833: José Rafael de Silva Fernández de Híjar, Duke of Híjar, Grandee of Spain

“Sumilleres de Corps” to  Queen Isabella II, 1833-1868 

 1833-1854: José Rafael de Silva Fernández de Híjar, Duke of Híjar, Grandee of Spain
 1854: Joaquín Fernández de Córdoba y Pacheco,  Marquess of Malpica, Grandee of Spain
 1854-1856: Luis Carondelet Castaños, Duke of Bailén, Grandee of Spain
 1856-1865: Vicente Pío Osorio de Moscoso y Ponce de León,  Count of Altamira, Grandee of Spain
 1865-1868: Joaquín Fernández de Córdoba y Pacheco,  Marquess of Malpica, Grandee of Spain

“Sumilleres de Corps” to  King Alfonso XIII, 1885-1931 

 1906-1909: Carlos Martínez de Irujo y del Alcazar, Duke of Sotomayor, Grandee of Spain
 1909-1925: Andrés Avelino de Salabert y Arteaga, Marquess of la Torrecilla, Grandee of Spain
 1925-1927: José Saavedra y Salamanca, Marquess of Viana, Grandee of Spain
 1927-1931: Luis María de Silva y Carvajal,  Duke of Miranda, Grandee of Spain

(1) “Sumilleres de Corps” in exile at Valençay

References 

 Enciclopedia universal ilustrada europeo-americana. Volume 49. Hijos de J. Espasa, Editores.1923
 Gómez-Centurión Carlos. Universidad Complutense de Madrid. Ministering the King,s body: The sumiller de corps in the 18th century. 2003
 Martínez Millán José. Universidad Autónoma de Madrid. Departamento de Historia Moderna. La Corte de Carlos V. 2000
 Martinéz Millán (dir). José. La Corte de Felipe II. Madrid. Alianza 1994
 Martínez Millán, José  y Visceglia, Maria Antonietta (Dirs.). La Monarquía de Felipe III. Madrid, Fundación Mapfre, 2008/2009
 Archivo General de Palacio (AGP) . Patrimonio Nacional. Sección Personal

Royal households
Spanish monarchy
Spanish courtiers